Thomas Tait (20 November 1908 – 1976) was an English footballer.

He played for Sunderland, Hetton, Middlesbrough, Southport, Manchester City, Bolton Wanderers, Luton Town, Bournemouth & Boscombe Athletic, Reading and Torquay United.

When Tommy joined Reading, £200 of his fee was provided by the supporters club. He scored a hat-trick on debut away at local rivals Aldershot, and was top scorer for the club on his first four seasons. He was also involved in a rare sending off when he punched a Millwall defender on Boxing Day 1934.

Notes

1908 births
1976 deaths
English footballers
Association football forwards
Sunderland A.F.C. players
Middlesbrough F.C. players
Southport F.C. players
Manchester City F.C. players
Bolton Wanderers F.C. players
Luton Town F.C. players
AFC Bournemouth players
Reading F.C. players
Torquay United F.C. players